Sarada  is a 1973 Telugu drama film starring Sarada and directed by K. Viswanath. The film is a remake of the 1972 Kannada movie Yaava Janmada Maitri which was also remade in Tamil as Radha (1973) and in Hindi as Dulhan (1975).

Plot
A psychiatrist visits a small village for a friend's marriage. Everyone thinks they have seen a ghost. The doctor soon finds out the reason. Sarada is an innocent village woman who likes everyone in the village and everyone in the village likes her. A doctor working in the village loves her. They marry after convincing her brother and village elders. One the day of their wedding, the doctor goes to attend an emergency patient. The boat taking him capsizes in the river Godavari and he dies. Sarada loses her sanity and forgets everything. Her brother and other villagers acts as if her husband went missing and would return soon. Sarada believes the psychiatrist to be her missing husband. The psychiatrist was told her miserable story by the village elders. He find that the only way he can help her regain her sanity is by playing along with her madness and act as her husband. The psychiatrist brings them to the town and treats them. His wife realises the situation and cooperates with him. Finally after some time, she learns the truth and asks everyone to excuse her for troubling them. Sarada and her brother decides to return to the village. She dies in the hands of her brother while crossing the river.

Cast
 Sharada... Insane Woman
 Sobhan Babu... Husband / Doctor
 Jayanti... Doctor's wife
 Kaikala Satyanarayana... Brother of Sarada
 Rao Gopal Rao
 Allu Ramalingaiah
 Rajababu
 Baby Dolly
 Shanta Devi

Soundtrack
 "Ato Ito Telipovali" (Singers: Chakravarti and Rama Rao)
 "Kanne Vadhuvuga Maredi Jeevitamlo Okesari" (Singers: Ghantasala and P. Susheela; Cast: Sobhan Babu and Sarada )
 "Naa Gudilo Gantalu Mroginavi" (Singer: P. Susheela; Cast: Sarada)
 "Radhalola Gopala Ganavilola Yadupala" (Singer: P. Susheela; Cast: Sarada)
 "Sarada, Nanu Cheraga Emitamma Sigga" (Lyrics: C. Narayana Reddy; Singer: V. Ramakrishna; Cast: Sobhan Babu and Sarada)
 "Shrimatigariki Teeranivela Shrivarikenduku Eegola" (Singers: V. Ramakrishna and P. Susheela; Cast: Sobhan Babu and Jayanti)
 "Vrepalle Vechenu Venuvu Vechenu" (Lyrics: C. Narayana Reddy; Singer: P. Susheela; Cast: Sarada)

Boxoffice
The film ran for more than 100 days in 5 centres in Andhra Pradesh i.e. Hyderabad, Guntur, Rajamundry, Kakinada and Nellore.

Awards
 Nandi Award for Best Feature Film - Gold - Kranthi Kumar (1973)

References

External links
 Sharada, 1973 Telugu film at IMDb.

1973 films
1970s Telugu-language films
Indian black-and-white films
Films directed by K. Viswanath
Indian drama films
Films scored by K. Chakravarthy
Telugu remakes of Kannada films